Two ships of the French Navy have borne the name Tilsitt in honour of the Treaties of Tilsit:

Ships named Tilsitt 
 , 80-gun ship of the line. 
 , a 90-gun ship of the line.

Notes and references

Notes

References

Bibliography 
 
 

French Navy ship names